Sir Albert Howard  (8 December 187320 October 1947) was an English botanist. His academic background might have been botany. While working in India he was generally considered a pathologist; this more than likely being the reason for his consistent observations of the value of compost applications being an increase in health (of the whole system). Howard was the first Westerner to document and publish the Indian techniques of sustainable agriculture. After spending considerable time learning from Indian peasants and the pests present in their soil, he called these two his professors. He was a principal figure in the early organic movement. He is considered by many in the English-speaking world to have been, along with Rudolf Steiner and Eve Balfour, one of the key advocates of ancient Indian techniques of organic agriculture.

Life

Albert Howard was born at Bishop's Castle, Shropshire. He was the son of Richard Howard, a farmer, and Ann Howard, née Kilvert. He was educated at Wrekin College, Royal College of Science, South Kensington, and as Foundation Scholar, at St. John's College, Cambridge. In 1896, he graduated in Biological Sciences at Cambridge, where he also obtained a Diploma of Phytopathology in 1897. 

In 1899, he lectured in Agricultural Science at Harrison College, Barbados, and in 1899 and 1902, was a Mycologist and Agricultural Lecturer at the Imperial Department of Agriculture for the West Indies. 

From 1903 to 1905, he was Botanist at the South Eastern Agricultural College and from 1905–1924, Imperial Economic Botanist to the Government of India. 

In 1914, he was created a Companion of the Indian Empire (C.I.E.), and received a Silver Medal of the Royal Society of Arts in 1920. From 1924–1931, Howard was Director of the Institute of Plant Industry, Indore, and Agricultural Adviser to States in Central India and Rajputana. He was made a Fellow of the Royal Asiatic Society in 1928, and in 1930 received the Barclay Memorial Medal of that society. 

He was knighted in 1934, and made an Honourable Fellow of the Imperial College of Science in 1935.

Howard worked in India as agricultural adviser and was in charge of a government research farm at Indore. He worked together with Gabrielle Matthaei (1876–1930), and her sister Louise (1880–1969). He married Gabrielle in 1905. After her death, he married Louise in 1931. Gabrielle was herself a professionally trained and competent botanist, and indeed the contribution of both women to organic farming is said to be underestimated.

Howard observed and came to support traditional Indian farming practices over conventional agricultural science. Though he journeyed to India to teach Western agricultural techniques he found that the Indians could in fact teach him more. One important aspect he took notice of was the connection between healthy soil and the villages' healthy populations, livestock and crop. Patrick Holden, Director of the UK Soil Association quoted Howard as saying "the health of soil, plant, animal and man is one and indivisible." He was president of the 13th session of the Indian Science Congress in 1926.

Howard built on the traditional Indian composting system into what is now known as the Indore method. He went on to further document Indian organic farming techniques, and spread its knowledge through the UK-based Soil Association, and the Rodale Institute in the US. His 1940 book, An Agricultural Testament, is a classic organic farming text. He emphasizes the importance of maintaining humus, keeping water in the soil, and the role of mycorrhiza. It was his first book aimed at the general public, and is his best popularly known work. However his 1931 book The Waste Products of Agriculture, based on 26 years of studying improved crop production in Indian smallholdings, is considered by some as his most important scientific publication. His 1945 book Farming and Gardening for Health or Disease was also intended for a general audience, and was republished in 1947 as The Soil and Health: A Study of Organic Agriculture. Howard's documentation of Indian farming practices influenced and inspired many farmers and agricultural scientists who furthered the organic movement, including Lady Eve Balfour (the Haughley Experiment, The Living Soil) and J. I. Rodale (Rodale Institute).

Howard advocated studying the forest in order to farm like the forest. He devoted the last half of his career to understanding that end, presaging those contemporary ecologists who advocate the understanding of the interface between ecology and agriculture. Indeed, Howard is grouped, along with Rudolf Steiner, Sir Robert McCarrison and Richard St. Barbe Baker, as one of the key progenitors of the Western organic agriculture movement. (However he says, in the Preface to An Agricultural Testament, "Some attention has also been paid to the Bio-Dynamic methods of agriculture in Holland and in Great Britain, but I remain unconvinced that the disciples of Rudolf Steiner can offer any real explanation of natural laws or have yet provided any practical examples which demonstrate the value of their theories.")

A tribute website from his home town of Bishops Castle is to be found here.

Publications
The following is a selection of publications by Albert Howard, including his better known works, and some lesser known publications. His knighthood was conferred in 1934, so in publications prior to that, he is not referred to as "Sir". Even subsequent to that, he did not always refer to himself as "Sir", as per his contribution to Nature in 1936, and his correspondence to the British Medical Journal in 1939. In the listings below, as far as known, in those from 1945 onwards, he is cited as "Sir Albert Howard", hence his authorship is not duplicated thereafter. See also External links section, where further publications by him may be read online.

 
  (Published for the Imperial Department of Agriculture in India; Calcutta). Listing at Open Library
 
 
 
 
 
 
  (Registration to view BMJ articles is free).
 
  pdf per Special Rodale Press Edition, 1976.
 
  (Howard's introduction to the 1945 publication of Charles Darwin's book, first published in 1881).
 
 
 
 
  (Originally published by Faber & Faber in 1945 as Farming and Gardening for Health or Disease)

See also
Biodynamic agriculture
Compost
List of sustainable agriculture topics
Organic farming

Explanatory notes 

a.  The online reproduction of Howard's 1931 work refers to him as "Sir Albert Howard". However, this is an error. He was not knighted until 1934, and would not have been referred to as Sir. The error is an artifact of the manner in which Howard's name has passed into contemporary public knowledge, via his two most famous books An Agricultural Testament (first published 1940), and Soil and Health (first published 1945 under a different title, but known mostly by this 1947 title), by which time he was referred to as "Sir". Indeed, prior to the advent of the internet and the related information explosion, these were the only two works popularly known by all but the most dedicated researchers, with even less known about his life history, beyond brief synopses associated with the books, and replicated in various book descriptions.

Citations

General and cited references 

 (The subject of two letters by Sir Albert Howard to the British Medical Journal – see 'Publications' section).

 ebook 
 pdf version

 (Contains tributes to Sir Albert Howard).

External links

The Works of Sir Albert Howard. With introduction by Keith Addison at Journey to Forever website.
Small Farms Library at Journey to Forever website (Contains publications by and about Sir Albert Howard).
Agriculture Library Index at Soil and Health Library of soilandhealth.org (Contains publications by and about Sir Albert Howard).
Crop Production in India (1924)
The Soil and Health New edition by A Distant Mirror, paperback and ebook.

1873 births
1947 deaths
20th-century British scientists
Academics of Wye College
Alumni of St John's College, Cambridge
Botanists active in India
Companions of the Order of the Indian Empire
Economic botanists
English agronomists
Organic farmers
Organic gardeners
People from Bishop's Castle
Scientists from Indore